Janet M. Simmons is a justice of the Court of Appeal for Ontario. She is a graduate of University of Toronto Faculty of Law. She has been a judge in Ontario since 1990, previously serving on the Court of Ontario.

See also
 Law of Canada
 List of Acts of Parliament of Canada
 Statutes of Canada

References

Living people
Place of birth missing (living people)
Year of birth missing (living people)
Justices of the Court of Appeal for Ontario
20th-century Canadian women